Güleçoba is a village in the Kayapınar District of Diyarbakır Province in Turkey.

References

Villages in Kayapınar District